The 14th season of Taniec z Gwiazdami, the Polish edition of Dancing With the Stars, started on 7 March 2014. Unlike the previous thirteen seasons, this one was aired on Polsat TV network. It was hosted by Krzysztof Ibisz and Anna Głogowska, season 13 professional champion. Beata Tyszkiewicz and Iwona Pavlović returned as judges, joined by a ballroom dancer and former World Latin Dance Champion Michał Malitowski as well as an actor Andrzej Grabowski.

On 23 May, Aneta Zając and her partner Stefano Terrazzino were crowned the champions, becoming the lowest scoring couple to ever win the show. It also marks the third time in history of the show the winning couple was outside the judges' top three. With three wins, Terrazzino is currently the most successful professional dancer in history of the show.

Couples

Scores

Red numbers indicate the lowest score for each week.
Green numbers indicate the highest score for each week.
 indicates the couple eliminated that week.
 indicates the returning couple that finished in the bottom two.
 indicates the returning couple that was the last to be called safe.
 indicates the winning couple.
 indicates the runner-up.

Notes:

Week 1: Joanna Moro scored 32 out of 40 for her Waltz, making it the highest score in this episode. It was the lowest of the highest ratings in the first episode ever (the same situation was, however, in the 3rd and 4th season). Natalia Siwiec got 18 points for her Cha-cha-cha, making it the lowest score of the week. Violetta & Krzysztof were eliminated despite being 9 points from the bottom.

Week 2: Dawid Kwiatkowski scored 35 out of 40 for his Cha-cha-cha, making it the highest score in this episode. Jacek Lenartowicz got 20 points for his Waltz, making it the lowest score of the week. Jacek & Paulina were eliminated.

Week 3: Joanna Moro scored 39 out of 40 for her Rumba, making it the highest score in this episode. Natalia Siwiec got 18 points for her Tango, making it the lowest score of the week. Antoni & Kamila were eliminated despite being 10 points from the bottom.

Week 4: Natalia Siwiec scored 36 out of 40 for her Paso Doble, making it the highest score in this episode. Michał Malitowski gave his first 10 to Natalia's Paso Doble. Karolina Szostak got 23 points for her Tango, making it the lowest score of the week. Karolina & Andrej were eliminated.

Week 5: Aneta Zając received the first perfect score of the season for her Rumba. Piotr Gruszka got 23 points for his Paso Doble, making it the lowest score of the week. Natalia & Jan were eliminated despite being 7 points from the bottom.

Week 6: All couples danced to love songs. There was a two-way tie on the first place, with Joanna Moro and Jacek Rozenek all getting 37 out of 40. Rafał Brzozowski got 24 points for his Cha-cha-cha, making it the lowest score of the week. Rafał & Izabela were eliminated.

Week 7: All couples danced Fushion. Joanna Moro and Dawid Kwiatkowski got their first perfect scores. Piotr Gruszka got 31 points for his Rumba Foxtrot, making it the lowest score of the week. Jacek & Magdalena were eliminated despite being 1 point from the bottom.

Week 8: Klaudia Halejcio received the first perfect score for her American Smooth. Joanna Moro received her second perfect score for the Charleston. Aneta Zając got 28 points for her Rumba, making it the lowest score of the week. Piotr & Nina were eliminated.

Week 9: All couples danced to Diva's songs. Klaudia Halejcio received her second perfect score for the Samba. Aneta Zając got 31 points for her Quickstep, making it the lowest score of the week. Klaudia & Tomasz were eliminated despite being 9 points from the bottom.

Week 10: All couples danced to Hollywood songs from movies. Joanna Moro received her third perfect score for the Quickstep. Aneta Zając got 31 points for her Foxtrot, making it the lowest score of the week. Dawid & Janja were eliminated despite being 15 points from the bottom. In Season 10 Janja Leser danced with Michał Kwiatkowski, brother of Dawid Kwiatkowski. They were albo eliminated in semi-final.

Week 11:  Both couples had to perform three dances: their favorite dance, judges's choice dance and a Freestyle. Joanna Moro received her 4th and 5th perfect scores for the Charleston and Freestyle. Aneta Zając received her 2nd and 3rd perfect scores for the Rumba and Freestyle. Aneta Zając got also 37 points for her Viennese Waltz, making it the lowest score of the week. Aneta & Stefano won the competition. This is the 8th time the winner was not on the first place according to the judges' scoreboard. In Season 11 Rafał Maserak and Stefano Terrazzino also danced in the finale. In Season 11 Rafał Maserak won the competition. Stefano Terrazzino won the competition for the third time since he won the 4th and 8th season with Kinga Rusin and Agata Kulesza. 
It was the fifth final for both Maserak and Terrazzino. Maserak won Season 10 with Anna Mucha and Season 11 with Julia Kamińska and took second place in the Season 2 with Małgorzata Foremniak and in Season 3 with Aleksandra Kwaśniewska. Terrazzino won Season 4 and Season 8 and took second place in the Season 6 with Justyna Steczkowska and in the Season 11 with Katarzyna Glinka.

Average score chart

Highest and lowest scoring performances 
The best and worst performances in each dance according to the judges' 40-point scale are as follows:

Couples' highest and lowest scoring dances

According to the traditional 40-point scale:

Weekly scores
Unless indicated otherwise, individual judges scores in the charts below (given in parentheses) are listed in this order from left to right: Andrzej Grabowski, Iwona Szymańska-Pavlović, Beata Tyszkiewicz and Michał Malitowski.

Week 1: Season Premiere

Running order

Week 2

Running order

Week 3

Running order

Week 4: Most Memorable Moments

Running order

Week 5

Running order

Week 6: Love Week

Running order

Week 7: Dance Fusions

Running order

Week 8

Running order

Week 9: Divas Week

Running order

Week 10: Hollywood Week (Semi-final)

Running order

Week 11: Season Finale
Running order

Dance chart
The celebrities and professional partners danced one of these routines for each corresponding week:
 Week 1 (Season Premiere): Cha-cha-cha or Waltz (women) and a group Swing (men)
 Week 2: Cha-cha-cha or Waltz (men) and a group Salsa (women)
 Week 3 (Personal Story Night): One unlearned dance (introducing Quickstep, Rumba, Jive, Tango, Foxtrot, Samba, Viennese Waltz) 
 Week 4: One unlearned dance (introducing Paso Doble)
 Week 5: One unlearned dance
 Week 6 (Love Night): One unlearned dance and a group dance Viennese Waltz
 Week 7 (Dance Fusion Night): One dance consisting of two different styles
 Week 8: One unlearned uncommon dance and one repeated dance
 Week 9 (Divas Night): One repeated dance and one unlearned dance
 Week 10 (Semi-final: Hollywood Night): One unlearned dance and one repeated dance
 Week 11 (Season Finale): Judges' choice, couple's favorite dance of the season and Freestyle

 Highest scoring dance
 Lowest scoring dance
 Performed, but not scored

Call-out order
The order in the first three weeks was based on judges' scores combined with viewers' votes. The order from week 4 onwards was random.

 This couple came in first place with the judges.
 This couple came in last place with the judges.
 This couple came in last place with the judges and was eliminated.
 This couple was eliminated.
 This couple won the competition.
 This couple came in second in the competition.
 This couple came in third in the competition.

Guest performances

Rating figures

Notes

References

External links
 

Season 14
2014 Polish television seasons